USS ARD-9 was an auxiliary repair dock serving with the United States Navy during World War II as Auxiliary floating drydock. Built by the Pacific Bridge Company.

ARD-9 was commissioned at Alameda, California on 25 September 1943, towed to San Francisco Bay, and anchored near the Floating Drydock Training Center at Tiburon, California. She had 5 dockings before leaving the United States.

At sea, the ship headed SSW and crossed the equator at 151 degrees and 50 minutes. She was 56 days at sea without seeing land. As the convoy entered the Coral Sea it was given an escort by an Australian corvette. The ARD-10 then left the convoy and went on to Perth. ARD-9 anchored at Naval Base Milne Bay , in Milne Bay, New Guinea on 6 February 1944.

She was sold to the Republic of China in 1976, where she served as Wo Fu (ARDS-5).

References
 

ARD-2-class floating drydocks
Ships built in Alameda, California
1943 ships
World War II auxiliary ships of the United States
Ships transferred from the United States Navy to the Republic of China Navy
Auxiliary ships of the Republic of China Navy